In quantum mechanics, the exchange operator , also known as permutation operator, is a quantum mechanical operator that acts on states in Fock space.  The exchange operator acts by switching the labels on any two identical particles described by the joint position quantum state .  Since the particles are identical, the notion of exchange symmetry requires that the exchange operator be unitary.

Construction

In three or higher dimensions, the exchange operator can represent a literal exchange of the positions of the pair of particles by motion of the particles in an adiabatic process, with all other particles held fixed.  Such motion is often not carried out in practice.  Rather, the operation is treated as a "what if" similar to a parity inversion or time reversal operation.  Consider two repeated operations of such a particle exchange:

Therefore,  is not only unitary but also an operator square root of 1, which leaves the possibilities

Both signs are realized in nature.  Particles satisfying the case of +1 are called bosons, and particles satisfying the case of −1 are called fermions.  The spin–statistics theorem dictates that all particles with integer spin are bosons whereas all particles with half-integer spin are fermions.

The exchange operator commutes with the Hamiltonian and is therefore a conserved quantity.  Therefore, it is always possible and usually most convenient to choose a basis in which the states are eigenstates of the exchange operator.  Such a state is either completely symmetric under exchange of all identical bosons or completely antisymmetric under exchange of all identical fermions of the system.  To do so for fermions, for example, the antisymmetrizer builds such a completely antisymmetric state.

In 2 dimensions, the adiabatic exchange of particles is not necessarily possible.  Instead, the eigenvalues of the exchange operator may be complex phase factors (in which case  is not Hermitian), see anyon for this case.  The exchange operator is not well defined in a strictly 1-dimensional system, though there are constructions of 1-dimensional networks that behave as effective 2-dimensional systems.

Quantum chemistry
A modified exchange operator is defined in the Hartree–Fock method of quantum chemistry, in order to estimate the exchange energy arising from the exchange statistics described above.  In this method, one often defines an energetic exchange operator as:

Their separation is denoted . The labels 1 and 2 are only for a notational convenience, since physically there is no way to keep track of "which electron is which".

See also
Exchange interaction
Hamiltonian (quantum mechanics)
Coulomb operator

References

External links
 2.3.Identical particles, P. Haynes 
Chapter 12, Multiple Particle States
Exchange of Identical and Possibly Indistinguishable Particles, J. Denker

Quantum chemistry